Shayla is an Islamic headgear worn by some Muslim women in the presence of any male outside of their immediate family. It is different from a khimar, because it is usually wrapped and pinned. Sometimes it is worn in the form of a half niqab with part of the face still appearing. 

It is traditionally worn by some women in Saudi Arabia and other Arab states of the Persian Gulf.

See also
Battoulah
Haik (garment)

References

Arab culture
Arabic clothing
Islam-related controversies
Islamic female clothing
Purdah
Veils